Sammy Davis may refer to:

 Sammy Davis (racing driver) (1887–1981), British journalist and motor racing driver
 Sammy Davis (footballer) (1900–1988), English footballer 
 Sammy Davis Sr. (1900–1988), American dancer
 Sammy Davis Jr. (1925–1990), American singer
 Little Sammy Davis (1928–2018), American blues harmonica player and singer
 Sammy L. Davis (born 1946), American soldier and Medal of Honor recipient
 Sammy Davis (American football) (born 1980), American football player
 Sammy Davis (ice hockey) (born 1997), American ice hockey forward

See also
 Sammi Davis (born 1964), British actress
 Samuel Davis (disambiguation)